Mount Andreyev  is a mountain, 2,320 m, standing close southwest of Mount Dallmann where it forms part of the southwest wall of Brattebotnen Cirque, in the Orvin Mountains, Queen Maud Land. Probably first seen by the German Antarctic Expedition, 1938–39. Mapped from air photos and surveys by Norwegian Antarctic Expedition, 1956–60; remapped by Soviet Antarctic Expedition, 1960–61, and named after Soviet historical geographer A.I. Andreyev (1887—1959).

References 

Mountains of Queen Maud Land
Princess Astrid Coast
Two-thousanders of Antarctica